The 1919–20 Princeton Tigers men's ice hockey season was the 20th season of play for the program.

Season
In its first full season since the end of World War I the ice hockey club was looking to regain some of the prestige it had in the early teens. The opportunities and opponents for the Tigers were also expanding, however, college ice hockey was still encountering the same problem it always had; lack of available ice.

Princeton spent a week in Concord, New Hampshire at the St. Paul's School facility which they were able to use to prepare for the start of their season. When they hit the ice in January they played at the Pavilion rink in Cambridge because the Boston Arena had been partially destroyed in a fire and was being rebuilt. The rink was so small that teams were forced to play with 6 players aside for the entire contest. Though they played well the Tigers fell 4–5. The following night Princeton was dominated by Toronto and, despite allowing 11 goals, Maxwell was noted as having played particularly well in the game.

Poor weather caused delays in the construction of the Philadelphia Ice Palace which caused several of the team's games to be rescheduled. They were able to play a game at New Rochelle, losing to the home team 2–4, but playing better with the normal 7 players. The Tigers returned to the Pavilion at the end of the month but several weeks of idleness due to the weather left the team at a disadvantage to Harvard who handed Princeton their fourth loss.

Princeton played the first intercollegiate game at the Philadelphia Ice Palace against Yale, losing 0–4. a few days later the Tigers managed to earn their first win of the season by downing the restarted Pennsylvania squad. After earning a second win over Quaker City Hockey Club the Tigers faced Yale in a rematch. In the second game against the Elis, the teams agreed to play the entire contest at 6-on-6 with three 15-minute periods. This may be the first college game purposefully played under modern conditions.

Princeton played well against Dartmouth, keeping up with their opponents until the fourth overtime period, a new program record. Four nights later, however, the Tigers were routed by Harvard again as the Crimson claimed the Championship.

Roster

Standings

Schedule and Results

|-
!colspan=12 style=";" | Regular Season

References

Princeton Tigers men's ice hockey seasons
Princeton
Princeton
Princeton
Princeton